Arnouph Louis Joseph Deshayes de Cambronne (or Arnould or Arnoult) (b,. March 26, 1768 in Crépy-en-Valois, Oise, d. 1846) was a former governor of the Château de Compiègne and the major adjudant of the National Guard (France).

Early life 
He was christened in the church of Saint-Denis en Crépy in 1768. He is the son of Joseph-Abraham Deshayes (1728, Guise – 1795, Orrouy), director of insinuations of the Apanage of Louis Philippe I, Duke of Orléans, and Cécile-Louise-Marguerite Doyen (1738–1815). He married Rosalie-Zélie de Hémant (1781–) on January 20, 1806. She was the daughter of a master of the Cour des comptes. He is the brother of Nicolas Alexandre Joseph Deshayes de Merville (1760–1816) who married Bonne Victoire Randon (1767–1824) in 1788.

Career 
He fought in 1792 next to baron Félix Le Peletier d'Aunay during the battle of Louis Joseph, Prince of Condé. They fought in the Company of Count du Comte de Laurétan to reach the Siege of Maastricht by the French revolutionary army directed by Francisco de Miranda, under the orders of Jean Thérèse de Beaumont d'Autichamp.

He was a volunteer in the Hussards of Hompesch commander by the Beaurepaire de Louvagny family in 1794, directed by the English before its settlement in Hanover in 1795. He joined the commandment of Franz-Simon Pfaff von Pfaffenhofen, Tyrol who made him an officer.

During the Bourbon Restoration, from February 15, 1815 to 1826, he became adjudant of the Château de Compiègne for the ultraroyalists. They were managed by Mathieu de Montmorency, minister of Foreign affairs (1821–1822) of the government of Joseph de Villèle and Durand Borel de Brétizel, with the agreement of the king, under the direction of the Count of Eugène François Léon de Béthune d'Hesdigneul and of Antoine Charles Louis de Lasalle.

In August 1822, he was promoted to colonel by king Louis XVIII and knight of the Order of Saint Louis. He changed his name to Deshayes, as in Deshayes de Cambronne, during the La Rochelle affair and the ennoblement of the general Pierre Cambronne. The latter was famous for his legendary word invented by Michel-Nicolas Balisson de Rougemont, quoted by Victor Hugo in Les Misérables.

He lived in the castle of Orrouy, on the domain of Champlieu, in the manor of Donneval and of La Mothe in Béthisy-Saint-Martin.

He became an Aide-de-camp to king Charles X, before he dismissed the Garde Nationale, in 1927.

He is the great-grand-father of Claude de Cambronne and the great-great-grand father of Laurence de Cambronne.

Family gallery

Awards 
 Chevalier de l'ordre royal de la Légion d'honneur in 1822

Bibliography 
 Non-inline source, L'Intermédiaire des chercheurs et curieux

See also 
 French nobility

External links 
 Léonore Basis

Notes 

1846 deaths
Chevaliers of the Légion d'honneur
Order of Saint Louis recipients
1768 births